Bulaki Das (born 1713) was an Indian Saint and Bhojpuri poet who is chiefly known for his Chaiti songs.

Life 
He was born in 1713 in a Sengarvanshi Rajput family at Sultanpur village of Ballia. His mother also used to write poems. He married a Chauhanvashi rajput Women in 1753. After some times he left his house and started living in a hut in Amanpur village which is known as Bulaki Das Mathiya. He was a good musician, writer and used to play Mridang.

References

Bhojpuri-language writers